The 1976 Ukrainian Cup was the 24th edition of the Ukrainian SSR football knockout competition, known as the Ukrainian Cup. The competition started on May 28, 1976. 

The last year cup holder Zirka Kirovohrad was knocked out of the competition by Metalist Kharkiv in the quarterfinals.

Teams

Tournament distribution
The competition was conducted among all 20 clubs of the 1976 Soviet Second League, Zone 6 and Bliuminh Kramatorsk.

Other professional teams
Many Ukrainian professional teams (9) in higher tiers of the Soviet football league pyramid did not take part in the competition.
 1976 Soviet Top League (6): FC Chornomorets Odesa, FC Dnipro Dnipropetrovsk, FC Dynamo Kyiv, FC Karpaty Lviv, FC Shakhtar Donetsk, FC Zorya Voroshylovhrad
 1976 Soviet First League (3): FC Metalurh Zaporizhia, FC Spartak Ivano-Frankivsk, SC Tavriya Simferopol

Competition schedule

First round (1/16)
Games were played on 28 May 1976.

|}

Notes
 The following clubs received bye for the next round: FC Metalist Kharkiv, FC Kolos Poltava, FC Zirka Kirovohrad, Blyuminh Kramatorsk, FC Shakhtar Horlivka, FC Avtomobilist Zhytomyr, SKA Odessa, FC Atlantyka Sevastopol, FC Novator Zhdanov, SC Lutsk, SKA Kiev (earlier this year SC Chernigov).
 Originally the game Khvylia – Krystal ended in 0:2 win of Kherson team, but the result was annulled and the win awarded to the Khmelnytskyi team due to the fact that Krystal fielded ineligible player.

Second round
Most games were played on 19 July 1976.

|}

Quarterfinals
Games were played on 29 September 1976.

|}

Semifinals
Games were played on 31 October 1976.

|}

Final

References

External links
 1976 Cup of the Ukrainian SSR
 Cup holders of the Ukrainian SSR

Football Cup of the Ukrainian SSR
1976 in Ukrainian football
1976 domestic association football cups